Kyle Milne Cameron (born 15 January 1997) is a professional footballer who plays as a centre-back or left-back for  club Notts County. He has played in the English Football League for York City and Newport County.

Early life
Born in Hexham, Northumberland, Cameron attended Bedlingtonshire Community High School while playing for Cramlington Juniors and Northburn.

Club career

Newcastle United
Cameron started his career with Newcastle United at the age of nine and debuted for the under-18 team during the 2012–13 season whilst still a schoolboy. Cameron signed a scholarship with the club in June 2013. Cameron joined Workington of the Northern Premier League Premier Division on 10 December 2015 on a youth loan with his debut only five days later in a 2–1 away win versus Marine in which he scored in the third minute and was named man of the match. After playing on four occasions and scoring one goal for Workington, Cameron joined League Two club York City on 11 January 2016 on a one-month youth loan. Cameron debuted five days later in York's 1–0 home defeat to Newport County. Cameron's loan deal was then extended until the end of the 2015–16 season having impressed in his four starts for York.

On 31 August 2016, Cameron joined League Two club Newport County on loan until early January 2017. Cameron debuted for the Newport on 24 September 2016 in a league match versus Cambridge United. Cameron then returned to Newcastle earlier than planned on 30 December 2016 after picking up an injury.

On 18 January 2018, Cameron joined Scottish Championship club Queen of the South on loan until the end of the 2017–18 season. He was released by Newcastle at the end of 2017–18.

Torquay United and Notts County
Cameron signed for newly relegated National League South club Torquay United on 16 July 2018.

Cameron signed for Torquay's National League rivals Notts County on 25 June 2021 on a two-year contract. Cameron captained Notts County to top of the league for the end of 2022, winning the December Player of the Month award.

International career
Cameron represented the England national under-16 team in 2012 and 2013, earning six caps. Cameron then switched his allegiance to Scotland and played for the under-17s at the 2014 UEFA European Under-17 Championship and also the under-19s at the 2016 UEFA European Under-19 Championship. Cameron debuted for the under-21 team in a 2–0 defeat away to Iceland during the 2017 UEFA European Under-21 Championship qualification campaign.

Career statistics

Honours
Torquay United
National League South: 2018–19

Individual
National League Player of the Month: December 2022

References

External links

Profile at the Torquay United F.C. website

1997 births
Living people
Sportspeople from Hexham
Footballers from Northumberland
English footballers
Scottish footballers
Association football defenders
Newcastle United F.C. players
Workington A.F.C. players
York City F.C. players
Newport County A.F.C. players
Queen of the South F.C. players
Torquay United F.C. players
Notts County F.C. players
Northern Premier League players
English Football League players
Scottish Professional Football League players
National League (English football) players
English people of Scottish descent
England youth international footballers
Scotland youth international footballers
Scotland under-21 international footballers